Sang Won Park (박상원; born 1950, in Seoul, South Korea) is a Korean-born musician.  He plays the kayagum and ajaeng, and sings in both traditional Korean and free improvisational styles.

He began his musical studies at the age of ten and later studied traditional instruments, voice, dance, and Western music at the National Conservatory in Seoul and at Seoul National University, earning B.A. and M.A. degrees in musicology.  He was also a member of the Traditional Music Orchestra of Seoul and a researcher at the Academy of Korean Studies, as well as an instructor at various music schools in Seoul.

Park relocated to the United States around 1980, moving to New York City.  He made his Western debut in Carnegie Recital Hall in 1979 and soon began performing and pre-recording in non-traditional settings, collaborating with Henry Kaiser, Laurie Anderson, Ryuichi Sakamoto, Jason Kao Hwang, and the Far East Side Band.  His trio with Henry Kaiser and Charles K. Noyes, called Invite the Spirit, was formed in the summer of 1983 and was probably the first free improvisation ensemble to integrate a Korean traditional musician.  The Far East Side Band is a multicultural music group with members from Chinese, Korean, Japanese, and African American backgrounds.  He has toured North America and Europe and has also worked with Bill Laswell and Joseph Celli.

He was also featured in Derek Bailey's Improvisation television series on the UK's Channel 4, as well as films by Laurie Anderson and Nam June Paik.

For many years, Park has earned his living primarily from operating two flower shops in New York City.  He has a forthcoming album on the Water Lily Acoustics label.

Discography

Solo
Le Kayagum de Park Sang-Won (Les Amis d'Orient/Sono Disc ESP 165528)

With Laurie Anderson
1984 - Laurie Anderson: Mister Heartbreak (on track 4)

With Henry Kaiser and Charles K. Noyes
1984 - Invite the Spirit

With Ryuichi Sakamoto
1989 - Beauty

Films
1986 - Home of the Brave: A Film by Laurie Anderson
c. 1990 - Improvisation (Channel 4)
1986 - Bye Bye Kipling (satellite spectacular produced by Nam June Paik on public television)

Radio programs
Old Traditions, New Sounds (public radio documentary)

External links
Sang-Won Park official site

See also
Gayageum
Korean music

1950 births
Living people
South Korean musicians
Seoul National University alumni